Hamel may refer to:

Places
 El Hamel, Algeria, a commune
 Hamel, Western Australia, a town
 Hamel, Nord, France, a commune
 Le Hamel (disambiguation), three communes in France
 Hamel, Illinois, United States, a village
 Hamel, Minnesota, United States, a neighborhood of Medina
 Hamel (river), Lower Saxony, Germany

People
 Hamel (surname)

Other uses
 Battle of Hamel, an Allied World War I attack in and around the French town of Le Hamel
 HAMEL, a type of steel pipe used in Operation Pluto in World War II
 Hamel Basis, in linear algebra the most common type of basis for a vector space
 Callejón de Hamel, a notable alley in Havana, Cuba

See also
 Cole Hamels (born 1983), American Major League Baseball pitcher
 Hamell on Trial, one-man band of Ed Hamell
 Hammel (disambiguation)